{{Infobox animanga/Other
| title           = Live-action film
| content         = 
 Mars: Tada, Kimi wo Aishiteru (film)
}}

 is a Japanese manga series written and illustrated by Fuyumi Soryo. Initially serialized in Bessatsu Friend from 1996 to 2000, the series spans 15 tankōbon volumes. It follows the teenage romance between Kira Aso, an introverted artist, and Rei Kashino, a troubled playboy who is a professional motorcycle racer. A single volume prequel, Mars: A Horse With No Name was released in 1999.

The manga is licensed for an English language release by Tokyopop, which has published all 15 volumes plus the prequel. The series was adapted into a 21 episode Taiwanese television drama in 2004. A Japanese television drama series adaptation titled  was broadcast on Nippon TV from January 24 to March 27, 2016 and a live action film adaptation of the same name was released in Japan on June 18, 2016.

Plot
Kira Aso and Rei Kashino meet when Rei asks Kira for directions to a local hospital one day in the park, but instead of telling him the directions she draws him a map and hands it to him without saying a word. On the back of the directions is a picture Kira drew of a mother and child. On the first day of school they are both surprised to find that they are in the same class. Later, Rei walks in on their teacher sexually harassing Kira. Rei promises to protect Kira in exchange for a painted version of the sketch that was on the back of the map. He also offers to "lend Kira his body," and she asks him to model for her. Thus beginning a relationship that is opposed by the world in general. They draw on their love for each other to heal the wounds the world has left on them; Rei, the scars from his twin's suicide for which he blames himself, and Kira, her hatred of men due to her stepfather having raped her when she was in middle school.

 Characters 
  is a teenage artist who lives with her mother and is Rei's love interest. Her father died in a car accident involving a motorcycle gang when she was ten years old. Her stepfather raped her when she was fourteen years old; due to the trauma caused by the experience Kira becomes a withdrawn and timid loner. When Kira's mother finally discovers what happened, she separates from her husband and begins living alone with Kira.
  is an extroverted playboy who rides motorcycles on the professional circuit with dreams of becoming a professional racer. Despite his dark and mysterious past, he remains cheerful and other people are easily drawn to him. After modeling for Kira, the unlikely pair begin to fall in love. In junior high, his younger twin committed suicide right in front of him, leaving deep scars. He tries to kill Kira's step-father, which was not his first attempt to mess with someone. While living in Los Angeles he attempted to shoot a boy that had been bullying his brother (the gun was not loaded). He also threatened to cut up (and later kill) the English teacher who had molested Kira.
  is Rei's best friend who also had a crush on Kira while they attended junior high together.
  is a female classmate of Kira and Rei's. She's been "in love" with Rei ever since they slept together in their freshman year. Although initially she makes Kira a target of brutal psychological attacks because of the growing connection between her and Rei, she later reforms and becomes a solid and protective friend.
  is a girl from Rei's past, she was Sei's girlfriend at first, but she then left Sei for Rei. She was the only girl that the two brothers both liked. She blames herself for Sei's death, and also tried to kill herself because she "couldn't live without either one of them (Rei and Sei)".
  is an effeminate sociopath who was often bullied by his only friend, Yuji Aoki. Rei had saved Masao from being beaten to death at one point in time, but he barely remembers this event as the action was impulsive because Rei was still in shock over Sei's death. Soon after this incident, Masao kills Aoki. Masao admits to having a crush on Rei, but he also claims to have a crush on Kira.
 Sei Kashino is the younger twin brother of Rei, he was an artist like Kira and was timid and always bullied, having to have his brother stand up for him. He was the one that found out that their father was not their real father. In junior high, he committed suicide by jumping off the school building killing himself right in front of Rei, leaving Rei with very deep emotional scars. Sei told his brother in his suicide letter that he wanted to leave those scars and that he had a darker mind then he thought because he wanted Rei to kill someone.

Media
Manga

Written and illustrated by Fuyumi Soryo, the chapters of Mars were serialized in Bessatsu Friend from 1995 to 2000. They were collected and published in 15 tankōbon volumes by Kodansha. The first volume was published on May 13, 1996; the last on December 13, 2000. A short prequel series, was serialized in the same magazine in 1999, and its chapters were published in a single tankōbon volume on December 9, 1999. From October 12, 2006 through January 12, 2007, Kodansha republished the series in Japan across eight kanzenban special edition volumes, collecting more chapters in each volume.

The manga series was licensed for an English language release in North America by Tokyopop. The first five chapters were serialized in Smile starting in the October 2001 issue, and running until the March 2001 issue. which published all fifteen volumes from April 23, 2002 through November 2003. It released A Horse With No Name on July  2004. Both titles are now considered "out of print" by Tokyopop.

Live action television series
In 2004, a twenty-one episode Taiwanese drama based on the manga series was broadcast on Chinese Television System starring Vic Zhou & Barbie Shu. In Mars the characters names were changed to Chinese names for localization, but it otherwise follows the manga's general plot. Another difference between media is that Rei Kashino drives a Ducati Monster motorcycle in the manga while Ling Chen drives a Yamaha Fazer in the drama. It was voted Favorite Drama of the Year at the 40th Annual 2005 Golden Bell Awards, and was the highest rated program in 2005 when it aired on the Philippine network QTV.

The live-action series uses two pieces of theme music, one opening and one ending theme. "零" (lit. "Zero") by Alan Kuo is used for the opening, while "Rang Wo Ai Ni" by Vic Zhou & Barbie Shu is used for the ending.

In 2016 NTV aired a new television drama adaption named Mars: Tada, Kimi wo Aishiteru! (Mars: But, I Love You! Japanese: MARS〜ただ、君を愛してる〜 ) which premiered in January, starring Taisuke Fujigaya as Rei Kashino and Masataka Kubota as Makio Kirishima. Both actors are listed as "double stars" of the series. Marie Iitoyo plays Kira Aso. The series will conclude its story with a film which will open in theaters throughout Japan on June 18, 2016.

Film

A live-action film adaptation and finale for the Japanese television drama series was released on June 18, 2016.

Reception
In Understanding Manga and Anime, Robin E. Brenner lists the title among her recommendations for "Best Romances and Melodrama", stating that "this manga romance literally has it all: romance, motorcycle races, bullying, haunted pasts, child abuse, friendly transvestites, murder, sociopaths, and more romance." She considered it an appealing "soap opera", and praised the scene where Rei and Kira make love as "gentle, sweet, and very much focused on the emotional impact on this progression in their relationship" versus being focused on "titillating readers". Reviewing the fourth volume to the series for Library Journal, Steve Raiteri considered Soryo's artwork "clean" and felt it did an expert job in "[portraying] Shiori's desperation, Kira's sadness and uncertainty, and Rei's living-in-the-moment changeability". Speaking to the series as a whole, he stated that it would appeal to both teen girls and to older readers due to its "depth and quality".

Though Ross Liversidge the online magazine UK Anime Network had low expectations for the series, he found it to be "flawless". Rating it a 10 out of 10, he considered its strong points to be its "delicate and detailed" artwork and, most importantly, its "normality, stating that it "smacks of a tragedy waiting to happen, and there are times even in this first volume that things start to get serious...but its done so well, and in such an understated manner that its utterly absorbing and keeps your attention." Manga: The Complete Guides author Jason Thompson highly praised the work, rating it four out of four stars. Calling it a "well-written, tightly plotted romance" that successfully deals with range of "powerful issues" that avoids being "preachy or patronizing", he considered Soryo's artwork to be "clear and attractive". However, he felt the prequel, Mars: Horse With No Name, did not add much to the overall story, noting that only the title story actually relates to the series. While he still praised the artwork and rated it three stars, he also considered the stories were "pale in comparison" to the original.Manga Life's Park Cooper praised the original Mars, noting that they "love[d] the characters, the story, and the tension that lies within the situations", but did not recommend doing more than browsing Horse With No Name, finding it to be less impressive and unlikely to appeal even to fans of the main series. He felt the titular story, which tells how Kira and Tatsuya became friends, to be "disappointing" and did not find it to be up to the same standard as the main series. However, he praised the second story, "Sleeping Lion", as making the volume worth the purchase and containing "the type of context in the story that got me to love MARS'' in the first place." The final story, "A One-Carat Fruit", he considered unengaging and left him unable to connect with the central characters. Overall, Cooper noted that while Soryo's artwork was not unique, she created "incredible looking characters" and "did a great job making certain expressions of the characters feel convincing."

Further reading

References

External links
 
 Official GTV Zhànshén Mars live-action series 

1996 manga
1999 manga
2000 comics endings
2004 Taiwanese television series debuts
2005 Taiwanese television series endings
2016 Japanese television series debuts
2016 Japanese television series endings
Chinese Television System original programming
Fuyumi Soryo
Japanese television dramas based on manga
Kodansha manga
Taiwanese television dramas based on manga
Manga adapted into films
Manga adapted into television series
Nippon TV dramas
School life in anime and manga
Romance anime and manga
Shōjo manga
Tokyopop titles